Ellington Is Forever is an album by guitarist Kenny Burrell featuring compositions associated with Duke Ellington recorded in 1975 and released on the Fantasy Records label. Originally released as a double album set in 1975 it was rereleased on CD in 1993 as Ellington Is Forever Volume 1.

Reception
The album has been critically well received. The Penguin Guide to Jazz numbers it among the "core collection" which jazz fans should possess.
Allmusic awarded the album 4½ stars stating "This is clearly an affectionate tribute, one born out of close association as well as great appreciation".

Track listing 
 "Jump for Joy" (Duke Ellington, Sid Kuller, Paul Francis Webster) - 1:48     
 "Caravan" (Ellington, Irving Mills, Juan Tizol) - 8:38     
 "Chelsea Bridge" (Billy Strayhorn) - 4:37     
 "Mood Indigo" (Barney Bigard, Ellington, Mills) - 4:33     
 "Don't Get Around Much Anymore" (Ellington, Bob Russell) - 3:15     
 "C Jam Blues" (Bigard, Ellington) - 15:31     
 "It Don't Mean a Thing (If It Ain't Got That Swing)" (Ellington, Mills) - 9:34     
 "I Didn't Know About You" (Ellington, Russell) - 5:11     
 "My Little Brown Book" (Strayhorn) - 3:28     
 "Blues Medley: Carnegie Blues/Rocks in My Bed/Jeep's Blues/The Creole Love Call" (Ellington/Ellington/Ellington, Johnny Hodges/Ellington, Milt Jackson, Bubber Miley) - 10:26     
 "Do Nothin' Till You Hear from Me" (Ellington, Russell) - 2:53     
 "Take the "A" Train" (Strayhorn) - 2:57

Personnel 
Kenny Burrell - guitar (tracks 1-8, 10 & 11)
Thad Jones - cornet, flügelhorn
Jon Faddis - trumpet, piccolo trumpet
Snooky Young - trumpet
Joe Henderson - tenor saxophone
Jerome Richardson - tenor saxophone, soprano saxophone
Jimmy Jones - piano
Jimmy Smith - organ
Stanley Gilbert - bass
Jimmie Smith - drums
Richie Goldberg, Mel Lewis - percussion (track 2)
Ernie Andrews - vocals (tracks 5 & 9)

References 

Kenny Burrell albums
1975 albums
Fantasy Records albums
Duke Ellington tribute albums